Kinlochard is a village in Stirling, Scotland. It lies to the western end of Loch Ard.  Children in Kinlochard attend Aberfoyle Primary School and eventually McLaren High School.

There is a recently renovated village hall, opened in April 2011, and is used as a venue for weddings and parties as well as being used by schools and cubs. The village hosts an annual Highland Games in mid July on the field opposite the village hall featuring many traditional events with a focus on family and community.

References

External links

Kinlochard village
Trossachs - Kinlochard

Hamlets in Stirling (council area)
Villages in Stirling (council area)
Trossachs